DeAnna Robbins (born June 15, 1959) is an American former actress known for her role as Lisa in the 1981 slasher film Final Exam, and for her role as Cindy Lake on the soap opera The Young and the Restless. She also appeared as Diane Parker on Days of Our Lives and as Kathleen McDougal on the NBC series Santa Barbara.

Biography

Early life
Robbins was raised in Tempe, Arizona.

Film and television career
Robbins made her film debut in the slasher film Final Exam (1981), followed by a regular guest starring role as Cindy Lake on The Young and the Restless.

She also guest-starred in many television shows and soap operas throughout the 1980s, including Eight Is Enough, Mr. Merlin, The Young and the Restless, Hotel, Matt Houston, Days of Our Lives, Crazy Like A Fox, and Finder of Lost Loves. She also portrayed the character of Aimee Godsey in three television film spin-offs of The Waltons.

Robbins married Chester Letsinger in 1983 while filming The Young and the Restless.

Retirement and career shift
In 1994, Robbins retired from acting and began a career as a realtor in Arizona. However, she has occasionally performed on stage: In 2000, she starred in a production of Beyond Therapy at the Phoenix Little Theatre as well as two 2001 productions of Israel Horovitz plays, Hopscotch and It's Called the Sugar Plum, staged at the Tempe Ensemble Theatre.

Filmography

References

External links

 

1959 births
American film actresses
Living people
20th-century American actresses
American stage actresses
American television actresses
Actresses from Arizona
People from Tempe, Arizona
21st-century American women